Leasing is a leasing company headquartered in Austin, Texas. The company leases furniture and housewares to residential and commercial customers in 15 U.S. metropolitan markets.

David Newberger founded  as a startup company in 1993. He sought competitive advantage by installing washer and dryer hookups  as a service amenity. In 2003,  quadrupled its business by acquiring the appliance leasing contracts of Web Service Company, based in Redondo Beach, California. In 2017, AZUMA decided to expand their business ventures into leasing furniture and housewares with the sale of the appliance business over to Appliance Warehouse.

References

External links 
 Official  Leasing website

Companies based in Austin, Texas
Financial services companies established in 1993
Leasing companies